The mouse-colored antshrike (Thamnophilus murinus) is a species of bird in the family Thamnophilidae.

It is found in Bolivia, Brazil, Colombia, Ecuador, French Guiana, Guyana, Peru, Suriname, and Venezuela. Its natural habitat is subtropical or tropical moist lowland forests.

The mouse-colored antshrike was described by the English ornithologists Philip Sclater and Osbert Salvin in 1868 and given its current binomial name Thamnophilus murinus.

References

mouse-colored antshrike
Birds of the Amazon Basin
Birds of the Guianas
mouse-colored antshrike
mouse-colored antshrike
mouse-colored antshrike
Taxonomy articles created by Polbot